Samter may refer to:

 German name of Szamotuły
 Kreis Samter, a county in the southern administrative district of Posen, Prussia
 Landkreis Samter

People 
 Ernst Samter (1868, Posen - 1926, Berlin), Jewish Polish-German classical philologist and religious scholar
 Martin Samter (1884, Posen - ?), Jewish Polish-German architect
 Alice Samter (1908, Berlin - 2004), a German music educator and composer
 Max Samter (1909, Berlin - 1999, Evanston), German-American physician
 Samter's triad

References 

German exonyms
German-language surnames
Jewish surnames
Surnames of Polish origin
Yiddish-language surnames